The Central League is a football league for reserve teams, primarily from the English Football League. For sponsorship purposes, it was branded as the Final Third Development League until the 2015/16 season.

The league was formed in 1911 and in its early years consisted of a mix of first teams and reserve teams. However, when the Football League Third Division North was created in 1921, all the first teams in the Central League became founder members.

Since then, the league has been for reserve teams only, and eventually expanded to include virtually every professional team in the South, Midlands and North of England. Southern teams used to play in the Football Combination. In recent years, the Premier Reserve League was created for reserve sides of Premier League teams, and so the Central League's membership has been reduced.

From the 2006/07 season the FA Premier Reserve League was restricted to the reserve sides of FA Premier League clubs. This meant that the reserve sides of Championship clubs rejoined the Central League.

Teams are not promoted to the Premier Reserve League based on their final league position, but on the league position of their respective clubs' senior teams. If the senior team is promoted to the Premier League, then the reserve team is promoted to the Premier Reserve League and replaced by the reserve teams of the relegated clubs.

It was announced on 31 December 2013 that the Central League secured a sponsorship arrangement with Final Third Sports Media, and was known as the 'Final Third Development League' with immediate effect for two seasons.

On 11 June 2014, it was announced that the league would expand to become a national competition by running a division in the south of the country for the 2014/15 season for the first time. The 2021–22 season was Northern only again, and only featured six teams, though the Central League Cup remained national. Wrexham joined for the 2022–23 season, despite not being in the EFL.

Champions

1911–2022

+ - Three divisions, overall winner decided after a series of play-offs.
^ - Three divisions, overall winner is the team with the best points per game ratio.
~ - Two divisions, overall winner is the team with the best points per game ratio.
 - Four divisions, overall winner is the team with the best points per game ratio.

Championships by club

Central League Cup
Since 1996 the league has also operated a cup competition – The Central League Cup.

Winners

See also
The Football Combination
Premier Reserve League
English Football League Youth Alliance
English Football League

References

External links
Official page on the English Football League website

 
Reserve football leagues in England